SPAH can be an abbreviation for:
 The Society for the Preservation and Advancement of the Harmonica
 Stacked pairs of alpha helices, a term for the alpha solenoid protein fold